Be Your Alibi is the debut studio album by indie rock band The Race.

Track listing
Find Out
Go Figure
Comfort, Comfort
When It Falls
Tom Song
Research
Raising Children
So Young And Beautiful
Smile
Amersham Road
Hope Song
They're Not Always Right (hidden track)

2006 albums